Actenodes is a genus of beetles in the family Buprestidae, containing the following species:

 Actenodes acornis (Say, 1833)
 Actenodes acuminipennis (Gory, 1841)
 Actenodes admirabilis Obenberger, 1932
 Actenodes adonis (Gory & Laporte, 1837)
 Actenodes aeneus (Gory, 1841)
 Actenodes africanus Obenberger, 1922
 Actenodes albifrons Théry, 1905
 Actenodes alluaudi Kerremans, 1894
 Actenodes amazonicus Kerremans, 1897
 Actenodes aphrodite Bleuzen, 1989
 Actenodes arizonicus Knull, 1927
 Actenodes auronotatus (Gory & Laporte, 1837)
 Actenodes bellulus (Mannerheim, 1837)
 Actenodes biarti Bleuzen, 1989
 Actenodes bifasciatus Waterhouse, 1882
 Actenodes bourgini Descarpentries, 1950
 Actenodes brasiliensis Bleuzen, 1989
 Actenodes buquetii (Gory, 1841)
 Actenodes calcaratus (Chevrolat, 1835)
 Actenodes caray Zayas, 1988
 Actenodes chalybaeitarsis (Chevrolat, 1834)
 Actenodes circumdatus (Gory, 1841)
 Actenodes congolanus Kerremans, 1898
 Actenodes costipennis (Gory & Laporte, 1837)
 Actenodes curvipes (Gory, 1841)
 Actenodes davidi Nelson, 1979
 Actenodes delagoanus Obenberger, 1928
 Actenodes dilatatus (Gory, 1841)
 Actenodes durantonorum Bleuzen, 1989
 Actenodes embrikstrandi Obenberger, 1936
 Actenodes flexicaulis Schaeffer, 1904
 Actenodes florencae Bleuzen, 1989
 Actenodes frater Théry, 1905
 Actenodes fulminatus (Schönherr, 1817)
 Actenodes gabonicus Thomson, 1858
 Actenodes garieppi Bleuzen, 1989
 Actenodes goryi (Mannerheim, 1837)
 Actenodes griveaudi Descarpentries, 1958
 Actenodes hahneli Bleuzen, 1989
 Actenodes hermes Bleuzen, 1989
 Actenodes heros Théry, 1923
 Actenodes hilari (Gory & Laporte, 1837)
 Actenodes hopfneri (Gory, 1841)
 Actenodes humeralis Waterhouse, 1882
 Actenodes insignis (Gory, 1841)
 Actenodes intermedia (Gory & Laporte, 1837)
 Actenodes krantzi Kerremans, 1911
 Actenodes laevifrons Waterhouse, 1882
 Actenodes lemoulti Théry, 1912
 Actenodes lestradei Bleuzen, 1989
 Actenodes lukuledianus Obenberger, 1928
 Actenodes manni Fisher, 1925
 Actenodes marmoratus (Gory & Laporte, 1837)
 Actenodes mars Bleuzen, 1989
 Actenodes mathani Bleuzen, 1989
 Actenodes mendax Horn, 1891
 Actenodes metallicus Waterhouse, 1889
 Actenodes milloti Descarpentries, 1950
 Actenodes mimicus Knull, 1964
 Actenodes minutus Bleuzen, 1989
 Actenodes miribellus Hoscheck, 1927
 Actenodes mniszechi Bleuzen, 1989
 Actenodes mokrzeckii Obenberger, 1928
 Actenodes montezumus Obenberger, 1918
 Actenodes muhlei Bleuzen, 1989
 Actenodes nevermanni Théry, 1934
 Actenodes nigritus Théry, 1925
 Actenodes nigroviridis Cobos, 1990
 Actenodes nobilis (Linnaeus, 1758)
 Actenodes oberthuri Bleuzen, 1989
 Actenodes obscuripennis (Gory & Laporte, 1837)
 Actenodes ornaticollis Kerremans, 1893
 Actenodes orvoeni Bleuzen, 1989
 Actenodes parvicollis Kerremans, 1897
 Actenodes pauliani Descarpentries, 1958
 Actenodes peyrierasi Descarpentries, 1966
 Actenodes purpureus Théry, 1925
 Actenodes pyropygus Fairmaire, 1903
 Actenodes regularis (Gory & Laporte, 1837)
 Actenodes reichei Thomson, 1878
 Actenodes rugofrontalis Bleuzen, 1989
 Actenodes sallei Thomson, 1878
 Actenodes scabriusculus Quedenfeldt, 1886
 Actenodes signatus (Gory & Laporte, 1837)
 Actenodes simi Fisher, 1940
 Actenodes solisi Barries, 2007
 Actenodes staudingeri Bleuzen, 1989
 Actenodes strandi Obenberger, 1922
 Actenodes subobscurus Bleuzen, 1989
 Actenodes undulatus Waterhouse, 1882
 Actenodes uniformis Théry, 1905
 Actenodes venus Bleuzen, 1989
 Actenodes versicolor (Gory & Laporte, 1837)
 Actenodes viettei Descarpentries, 1955
 Actenodes vilhenai Descarpentries, 1960
 Actenodes violaceovirescens Cobos, 1990
 Actenodes viossati Descarpentries, 1974
 Actenodes viridicollis Kerremans, 1897

References

Buprestidae genera